Zvonimir Cimermančić (26 August 1917 – 17 May 1979) was a Croatian footballer. He represented Yugoslavia at the 1948 Summer Olympics.

Club career
He began his playing career with HŠK Građanski Zagreb's youth side before moving to NK Slavija Varaždin. In 1938 he returned to Građanski and in the following season won the Kingdom of Yugoslavia's last national championship. He played with Građanski in the Independent State of Croatia's First League until the state's demise and the club's disbanding at the end of the Second World War by Yugoslavian communists. He had become Croatian national champion with the club during the 1943 season. Afterwards, he played for NK Lokomotiva and Građanski's replacement regime-club NK Dinamo Zagreb.

International career
Cimermančić has the distinction of having played for two FIFA-recognized national teams, three nations, and four national teams in all. In 1940, Cimermančić debuted for the Kingdom of Yugoslavia's national team (Beli Orlovi) and concurrently played four matches for the Banovina of Croatia's national team, which represented the Croatian statelet within the kingdom. With the establishment of the Independent State of Croatia and its respective national team, he suited up thirteen times and scored six goals for the country. After the war, he also played for communist Yugoslavia's national team. His final international was an August 1948 Olympic Games match against Sweden.

Personal life
After his playing career, Cimermančić worked as a dentist. He died in a road accident in Zagreb in 1979 and is buried in Mirogoj Cemetery.

References

External links
 
Profile at the Serbian football federation

1917 births
1979 deaths
Footballers from Zagreb
Association football forwards
Association football defenders
Croatian footballers
Croatia international footballers
Yugoslav footballers
Yugoslavia international footballers
Dual internationalists (football)
Olympic medalists in football
Medalists at the 1948 Summer Olympics
Olympic footballers of Yugoslavia
Olympic silver medalists for Yugoslavia
Footballers at the 1948 Summer Olympics
HŠK Concordia players
HŠK Građanski Zagreb players
NK Lokomotiva Zagreb players
GNK Dinamo Zagreb players
Yugoslav First League players
Road incident deaths in Croatia
Burials at Mirogoj Cemetery